Perpetua Ijeoma Nkwocha  (born 3 January 1976) is a Nigerian female professional footballer, who is the coach of Clemensnäs IF from Swedish Women's Football Division 2, she previously played for Swedish club Sunnanå SK. She was also a member and formerly the captain of the Nigeria women's national football team.

International career
With the Nigeria national team Nkwocha has participated in seven CAF Women's Championship editions (2002, 2004, 2006, 2008, 2010, 2012 and 2014), winning five of them (2002, 2004, 2006, 2010 and 2014). At the 2004 African Women's Championship, she scored four goals in the final against Cameroon to help her country win the title. She also set a record by scoring nine overall goals during the tournament, and was named the best player of the tournament. Nkwocha was voted African Women's Footballer of the Year in 2004, 2005, 2010 and 2011 by Confederation of African Football (CAF).

Nkwocha has also participated in four FIFA Women's World Cup (2003, 2007, 2011 and 2015), as well as the Olympic tournaments of Sydney 2000, Athens 2004, and Beijing 2008.

Club career
She played for Swedish side Sunnanå SK in both the top division (Damallsvenskan) and the second division (Elitettan) leagues from 2007 until 2014.

In June 2008, the BBC reported that Nkwocha had announced her plans to retire in two years, and that after doing so she wants to continue to be involved in football by becoming a coach. As of 2012 she was still playing in Sweden's second-tier league.

Ahead of the 2015 season, 39-year-old Nkwocha left Sunnanå to join lower division (4th tier) Clemensnäs IF in a player-coach role. She spent part of the previous season coaching boys' football in Nigeria, but wanted to settle in Sweden after taking Swedish citizenship.

International goals

Personal life 
Nkwocha is in partnership with former Turkey based Çanakkale Dardanelspor professional striker and now by Piteå IF playing Ghanaian footballer Justice Tetteh Komey.

Honours

International
 Nigeria
 African Women's Championship (5): 2002, 2004, 2006, 2010, 2014

Individual
 African Women's Footballer of the Year (4): 2004, 2005, 2010, 2011
 African Women's Championship Top goalscorer (3): 2004, 2006, 2010

References

External links
 
 Pictures of Perpetua receiving African Women Player of the Year award in 2004
  (archive)
  
 

1976 births
Living people
Nigerian women's footballers
Nigeria women's international footballers
2003 FIFA Women's World Cup players
2007 FIFA Women's World Cup players
Footballers at the 2000 Summer Olympics
Footballers at the 2004 Summer Olympics
Footballers at the 2008 Summer Olympics
Olympic footballers of Nigeria
2011 FIFA Women's World Cup players
2015 FIFA Women's World Cup players
Sunnanå SK players
Damallsvenskan players
Expatriate women's footballers in Sweden
Nigerian expatriate sportspeople in Sweden
Nigerian expatriate footballers
Women's association football midfielders
African Women's Footballer of the Year winners
Igbo people